Ljubomir Ivanović Gedža (25 December 1925 – 2 December 1980) was a Yugoslav and Serbian wrestler and a wrestling coach.

A memorial wrestling tournament is being held in his honor in Mladenovac. Ljubomir Ivanović Gedža was very successful as a coach, which is evidenced by the fact that wrestlers under his leadership won a total of 55 medals in the biggest competitions (Olympic Games, World Championships and European Championships).

References

Literature
 

1925 births
1980 deaths
People from Mladenovac
Serbian male sport wrestlers
Yugoslav male sport wrestlers